The Carré d'art at Nîmes in southern France houses a museum of contemporary art and the city's municipal library. Constructed of glass, concrete and steel, it faces the Maison carrée, a perfectly preserved Roman temple that dates from the very beginning of the 1st century AD. In 1984, twelve architects, including Frank Gehry, Jean Nouvel and César Pelli, were invited to submit proposals for the museum. A design by the British architect Norman Foster was selected, and the building was opened in May 1993.

The building was constructed as part of a project to refurbish the square in which the Maison carrée stands, and provides a new setting for the ancient temple. The building is a nine-storey structure, half of which is sunk deep into the ground, keeping the building's profile low in sympathy with the scale of the surrounding buildings. The lower levels house archive storage and a cinema.

References

External links
 Carré d'Art - musée d'art contemporain - official site

Foster and Partners buildings
Buildings and structures in Nîmes
Arts centres in France
Libraries in France
Museums in Gard
Art museums and galleries in France
Cultural infrastructure completed in 1993
Library buildings completed in 1993
Art museums established in 1993
Libraries established in 1993
1993 establishments in France
Tourist attractions in Nîmes
Organizations based in Occitania (administrative region)
20th-century architecture in France